Ranchos is a town in Buenos Aires Province, Argentina. It is the administrative centre for General Paz Partido.

The settlement was established on January 15, 1871 by provincial law number 422.

Attractions

The town lies near "Laguna Ranchos" lake, which features three islands and a range of flora and fauna. 
Replica Fort, in 1967 a replica of the original fort built in 1781.
Ranchos Historical Museum.
Festival de Fortines, a festival that takes place on the central island of Lake Ranchos.
Church of Nuestra Señora del Pilar, built in 1863.

External links

Populated places in Buenos Aires Province
Populated places established in 1781
1871 establishments in Argentina